"Just One Last Time" is a song performed by French DJ and music producer David Guetta, featuring vocals from Swedish vocal duo Taped Rai. The track was released as the second single from the re-release of Nothing but the Beat, 2.0, and serves as the album's eighth single overall. The song was released via digital download on 15 November 2012 and was released as a CD single on 8 February 2013. The song is used as the theme song for the film A Good Day to Die Hard (2013).

Music video

An official video for the track was uploaded to Guetta's official VEVO channel on 3 December 2012. The music video for the track was filmed in Los Angeles during October 2012 by director Colin Tilley. It features a man going in his half-burned house and lying on the bed and remembering the death of his girlfriend, reliving it and trying to change the past in his mind: he is sneaking out of his girlfriend's house to go and play a game of pool with Guetta, only to hear that the house is on fire. He races back to save his girlfriend, this time managing to do so, but is killed in the process.

Track listing

Charts and certifications

Weekly charts

Certifications

Year-end charts

Release history

References

2012 singles
David Guetta songs
Music videos directed by Colin Tilley
Songs written by David Guetta
Songs written by Giorgio Tuinfort
2010 songs
Virgin Records singles
Song recordings produced by David Guetta